Masinalupe Makesi Masinalupe (born ~1961) is a Samoan politician. He is a member of the Fa'atuatua i le Atua Samoa ua Tasi.

Masinalupe was born in Lefaga and educated at Safa'ato'a Primary School, Lefaga Junior High School and Leulumoega College. He trained as a mechanic, and worked as a mechanic and manager before starting his own transport company, where he drove one of his own buses.

He was first elected to the Legislative Assembly of Samoa in the April 2021 Samoan general election, winning the seat of Lefaga and Faleaseela. On 28 July 2021 he was appointed Associate Minister of Customs.

References

Living people
Members of the Legislative Assembly of Samoa
Faʻatuatua i le Atua Samoa ua Tasi politicians
Samoan businesspeople
People from A'ana
Year of birth missing (living people)